The Japan–Korea Treaty of 1885, also known as the  with Hanseong being a historical name for Seoul, was negotiated between Japan and Korea following an unsuccessful coup d'état in the Korean capital in December 1884.

Background
A coup d'état, also known as the Gapsin Coup, was attempted on December 4, 1884.  The timing of the coup took advantage of the fact that the Chinese withdrew half of its garrison troops from Seoul.

After only three days, the revolt was suppressed by Chinese military forces which were garrisoned in the Korean capital city of Hanseong (Seoul).  During the conflict, the Japanese legation building was burned down, and forty Japanese were killed.

Inoue Kaoru was the chief Japanese diplomat in dealings with Korea.  Diplomatic negotiations were concluded in January 1885.

Treaty provisions
The Japanese government demanded and received an apology and reparations.

Aftermath
In an effort to defuse tensions over Korea, both Japan and China agreed to withdraw their troops from Korea in the Convention of Tientsin of April 1885.

See also
 Unequal treaties

Notes

References
 Duus, Peter. (1995). The Abacus and the Sword: The Japanese Penetration of Korea, 1895-1910. Berkeley: University of California Press. ; 
 Kim, Chun-gil. (2005). The History of Korea. Westport, Connecticut: Greenwood Press. ; 

Japan–Korea relations
History of the foreign relations of Japan
Unequal treaties
Treaties of the Empire of Japan
Treaties of the Joseon dynasty
1885 treaties
1885 in Japan
1885 in Korea
Bilateral treaties of Japan